Putrela is a village in Krishna district of the Indian state of Andhra Pradesh. It is located in Vissannapet mandal of Nuzvid revenue division. The village is famous about Hindu temple called, Maremma Thalli Temple. Every day, the hundreds of devotees have been visiting to temple from Krishna& Khammam Dist and specially on Thursday& Sunday.

The Village itself is famous for Mango Gardens and every summer they have been doing the mango export business throughout India.

As of 2011, Putrela has a total population of 9329, of which 4709 are male, 4620 are female, and 937 are below the age of 7. The average literacy rate is 67.45%.

See also 
Villages in Vissannapet mandal

References

Villages in Krishna district